Handwriting is the writing done with a writing instrument, such as a pen or pencil,  in the hand. Handwriting includes both printing and cursive styles and is separate from formal calligraphy or typeface. Because each person's handwriting is unique and different, it can be used to verify a document's writer. The deterioration of a person's handwriting is also a symptom or result of several different diseases. The inability to produce clear and coherent handwriting is also known as dysgraphia.

Uniqueness
Each person has their own unique style of handwriting, whether it is everyday handwriting or their personal signature. Cultural environment and the characteristics of the written form of the first language that one learns to write are the primary influences on the development of one's own unique handwriting style. Even identical twins who share appearance and genetics do not have the same handwriting

Characteristics of handwriting include:
 the specific shape of letters, e.g. their roundness or sharpness
 regular or irregular spacing between letters
 the slope of the letters
 the rhythmic repetition of the elements or arrhythmia
 the pressure to the paper
 the average size of letters
 the thickness of letters

Medical conditions

Developmental dysgraphia is very often accompanied by other learning and/or neurodevelopmental disorder  like ADHD. Similarly, people with ADD/ADHD have higher rates of dyslexia. It is unknown how many individuals with ADD/ADHD who also struggle with penmanship actually have undiagnosed specific learning disabilities like developmental dyslexia or developmental dysgraphia causing their handwriting difficulties.

Children with ADHD have been found to be more likely to have less legible handwriting, make more spelling errors, more insertions and/or deletions of letters and more corrections. In children with these difficulties, the letters tend to be larger with wide variability of letters, letter spacing, word spacing, and the alignment of letters on the baseline. Variability of handwriting increases with longer texts. Fluency of the movement is normal but children with ADHD were more likely to make slower movements during the handwriting task and hold the pen longer in the air between movements, especially when they had to write complex letters, implying that planning the movement may take longer.  Children who have ADHD were more likely to have difficulty parameterising movements in a consistent way. This has been explained with motor skill impairment either due to lack of attention or lack of inhibition. To anticipate a change of direction between strokes, constant visual attention is essential. With inattention, changes will occur too late, resulting in higher letters and poor alignment of letters on the baseline.  The influence of medication on the quality of handwriting is not clear.

Graphology
Graphology is the pseudoscientific study and analysis of handwriting in relation to human psychology. Graphology is primarily used as a recruiting tool in the applicant screening process for predicting personality traits and job performance, despite research showing consistently null correlations for these uses.

Handwriting recognition

See also

References

Further reading
Gaze, T. & Jacobson, M. (editors), (2013). An Anthology of Asemic Handwriting. Uitgeverij. 

Hofer, Philip, and John Howard Benson. 1953. The art of handwriting: a loan exhibition of writing books and manuscripts from the collections of Philip Hofer, Harvard University, and John Howard Benson. [Providence]: Rhode Island School of Design, Museum of Art.

Thornton, Tamara Plakins (1998). Handwriting in America: A Cultural History. Yale University Press.

Graphology
Penmanship
Questioned document examination